George McGowan was a Scottish footballer, who played as a centre forward in the Football League for Chester and Stockport County.

References

1943 births
2009 deaths
Scottish footballers
People from Carluke
Association football forwards
Chester City F.C. players
English Football League players
Preston North End F.C. players
Rhyl F.C. players
Stockport County F.C. players